This is a list of episodes for The Daily Show with Jon Stewart in 2001. Dave Navarro was the scheduled guest for September 11. The episode was not aired following the September 11 attacks. Following the attacks The Daily Show went on hiatus and returned on September 20 with a clip show, before returning to its regular format on September 24.

2001

January

February

March

April

May

June

July

August

September

* Episode cancelled.

October

November

December

 This show did not air due to the September 11 attacks

† These episodes were hosted by Stephen Colbert.

~ This episode was hosted by Steve Carell.

¥ This episode was hosted by Nancy Walls.

↔ This episode was hosted by Vance DeGeneres.

‡ This episode was hosted by Mo Rocca.

References

 
Daily Show guests
Daily Show guests (2001)